Of the 9 Tennessee incumbents, 7 were re-elected, 1 retired, and 1 lost re-election.

See also 
 List of United States representatives from Tennessee
 United States House of Representatives elections, 1972

1972
Tennessee
1972 Tennessee elections